Lalbiakzuala (born 27 May 2000) is an Indian footballer who plays as a defender for Indian club Aizawl in the  I-League.

Club career
Born in India, Lalbiakzuala made his senior debut with I-League side Aizawl in the 2018–19 season. He earlier was the part of the Aizawl F.C. U-18.

References

External links

2000 births
Living people
Footballers from Mizoram
Association football defenders
I-League players
Indian footballers
Aizawl FC players